Atatürk Arboretum is an arboretum in Bahçeköy, Sarıyer, Istanbul Province, Turkey.

The establishment of an arboretum was proposed by Hayrettin Kayacık, professor  of the Faculty of Forestry at Istanbul University in 1949. Between 1959 and 1961, Camille Guinet, inspector of the Sorbonne University's botanical garden, planned the road network inside the arboretum. Due to financial shortages, accomplishment of the project took time. Opened on July 12, 1982, it was named in honor of Mustafa Kemal Atatürk (1881–1938), the founder of Turkish Republic, on his 100th birthday anniversary. It is owned and financed by the Directorate General of Forestry, which is also responsible for the administrative operation. Istanbul University's Faculty of Forestry is the scientific partner of the park's executive board.

The main goal of the arboretum is
to serve the faculty and the students of Istanbul University's Forestry Department including the relevant agencies of the Ministry of Forest and Water Management, forest engineers, landscape architects, domestic and foreign scientists as well as nature lovers in their research work.

It contains the 1818-built Kirazlı Dam and a 1916-establıshed plant nursery.

Gallery

References

Arboreta in Turkey
Botanical gardens in Turkey
Protected areas of Turkey
Sites of Special Scientific Interest notified in 1992
1992 establishments in Turkey
Istanbul University
Sarıyer
Arboretum